Baharan may refer to:
Baharan Shahr, a city in Iran
Baharan, Isfahan, a village in Isfahan Province, Iran
Baharan, Kermanshah, a village in Kermanshah Province, Iran
Baharan, Markazi, a village in Markazi Province, Iran
Baharan District, an administrative subdivision of Iran